Germania Bietigheim is a German association football club from the village of Bietigheim near Rastatt, Baden-Württemberg.

History
The club was established in 1919 as Fußballclub Germania Bietigheim in 1919, and following World War II, was reformed as SpV Bietigheim. In 1950, the club resumed its historical identity as Sportverein Germania Bietigheim.

The club's highest rise was to the third tier Amateurliga Südbaden in 1969. They finished 14th in their debut season there before being sent down following a 16th place result in 1970–71.

A club of the same name plays in the village of Bietigheim-Bissingen (Bietigheim an der Enz), Baden-Württemberg, near Stuttgart.

References

External links
Official team site

Football clubs in Germany
Football clubs in Baden-Württemberg
Association football clubs established in 1919
1919 establishments in Germany